The National Day Cup is a Group 3 Thoroughbred handicap horse race in Hong Kong, run at Sha Tin over 1000 metres.  It takes place every year on 1 October, Hong Kong National Day. Originally run over 1400 metres, it replaced the Sha Tin Sprint Trophy in 2014, with the Celebration Cup a new race over 1400 metres. It is one of only two Group races run over 1000 metres in Hong Kong each year, along with January's Bauhinia Sprint Trophy.

Winners

See also
 List of Hong Kong horse races

References 
Racing Post:

The Hong Kong Jockey Club racing results of National Day Cup (2011/12)
 Racing Information of National Day Cup (2011/12)
 The Hong Kong Jockey Club 

Horse races in Hong Kong

zh:國慶盃